Barry Railway Class B were 0-6-2T steam tank locomotives of the Barry Railway in South Wales.  They were designed and built by Sharp Stewart and were virtually identical to the Class A that preceded it, with the addition of a trailing bogie.  The first three, Nos. 6, 7 and 8 were introduced in December 1888 and the remainder of the batch (Nos. 9 to 20) were delivered between January and May of 1889.  No. 7 was vacuum fitted and thus was able to haul passenger services as the relief engine for No. 5, a Class A.

The main purpose of the engine was to haul mineral trains to Cadoxton from Hafod Sidings in Rhondda and from Treforest Junction as well as from Coity Junction near Bridgend and Peterstone Junction.  The second batch (Nos. 23 to 32) were delivered between December 1889 and February 1890 and differed from the first batch in having a Type 2 boiler. This led to them initially being called Class B1s.  

The locomotives passed to the Great Western Railway in 1922.  Only four survived into British Railways ownership in 1948, numbers 198, 212, 213, and 231. None were preserved.

Numbering

References

B
0-6-2T locomotives
Sharp Stewart locomotives
Railway locomotives introduced in 1888
Standard gauge steam locomotives of Great Britain
Scrapped locomotives